Sumner Alvord Dole (1892 – January 22, 1997) was an American football, basketball and baseball and coach. He served as the head football coach at the University of Connecticut from 1923 to 1933, compiling a record of 36–39–14. Dole was also the head basketball coach at the University of Massachusetts from 1917 to 1918 and Connecticut from 1923 to 1927, amassing a career college basketball coaching record of 45–35.

Head coaching record

Football

References

External links
 

1892 births
1997 deaths
UConn Huskies football coaches
UConn Huskies men's basketball coaches
UConn Huskies baseball coaches
UMass Minutemen basketball coaches
UMass Minutemen football players